Little Pauls Creek is a  long 2nd order tributary to Pauls Creek in Carroll County, Virginia.

Course 
Little Pauls Creek rises about 1 mile south of Skyland Lakes, Virginia, in Carroll County and then flows southeast to join Pauls Creek about 1.5 miles southwest of Cana, Virginia.

Watershed 
Little Pauls Creek drains  of area, receives about 51.4 in/year of precipitation, has a wetness index of 303.56, and is about 73% forested.

See also 
 List of Rivers of Virginia

References 

Rivers of Carroll County, Virginia
Rivers of Virginia